Phyllonorycter pruinosella is a moth of the family Gracillariidae. It is known from Bengal and Bombay in what is now India and Bangladesh.

The larvae feed on Salix species, including Salix tetrasperma. They probably mine the leaves of their host plant.

References

iteina
Moths of Asia
Moths described in 1918